American Canadians are Canadians of American descent. The term is most often used to refer to Canadians who migrated from or have ancestry from the United States.

Demography
According to the 2016 Census, 29,590 Canadians reported American as being their singular ethnicity, while 347,810 reported partial ancestry.

There has not been a reliable estimate of the total number of Americans from the United States who have settled in Canada since the founding of the two countries as the United States in 1776 and Canada in 1867.  Prior to the independence of the United States and the formation of Canada, the settled areas were British colonies. 

Many American Canadians chose to live in major cities such as Toronto and other urban areas of southern Ontario, such as Windsor, facing Detroit, and Niagara Falls, Ontario, across from Niagara Falls, New York, in the Buffalo area.  Vancouver; Osoyoos, British Columbia; Edmonton, Alberta; and Calgary, Alberta, also have American expatriate colonies. 

Most of American Canadians prefer to live in the metropolitan areas of Vancouver, Toronto and Montreal. Vancouver is the Canadian city with most Americans living outside of the United States, followed by Toronto as third and Montreal as fifth.

History of Americans in Canada

Americans have moved to Canada throughout history. During the American Revolution, many white Americans, 15-25% of the population (300-500,000), loyal to the British crown left the United States and settled in Canada. By 1783, 46,000 had settled in Ontario (10,000) and the Maritimes (36,000). These early settlers were officially designated United Empire Loyalists and referred to as the King's Loyal Americans. Many Black Canadians are descendants of African American slaves (Black Loyalists) who fled to Canada during the American Revolution. Similar waves of American immigrants, 30,000, lured by promises of land if they swore a loyalty oath to the King,  settled in Ontario before the War of 1812. The Black Refugees in the War of 1812 also fled to Canada and many American slaves also came via the Underground Railroad, most settling in either Halifax, Nova Scotia or Southern Ontario. At the outbreak of the war of 1812 80,000 of 110,000 inhabitants in Ontario were American born or descendants of Americans. In the Maritimes 110,000 of 135,000 were Americans who settled before 1775 or after and their descendants. This fact gave English-speaking Canada a pronounced American cultural flavor into the 1830s. The difference was political: those who disliked the split with Britain and those who supported it.

In the early 20th century, over 750,000 American settlers moved into the farming regions of the Prairie Provinces of Alberta, Manitoba and Saskatchewan. Many of these were immigrants (or children of immigrants) from Europe or Eastern Canada who had gone to the United States looking for farm land only to find the supply of free farmsteads there exhausted.  Others were old-stock European Americans, and a small percentage were racial minorities, such as African Americans. In 1916, Americans accounted for 36% of all the foreign-born residents of Alberta, 30% in Saskatchewan, and 8% in Manitoba. or about 400,000 in a total population of the three provinces close to 1.5 million. Not all stayed.

In the 1930s, before World War II, and again in the 1970s, waves of Americans,  many from Texas and Oklahoma, migrated to Canada to work in the country's growing oil industry. During the Vietnam War era, many American draft dodgers fled to Canada to avoid the war. About 10,200 Americans moved to Canada in 2006; this was the highest number since 1977.

Notable people

See also
 United States
 American English
 Canada–United States border
 Québécois
 United Empire Loyalist

References

 Statistics Canada

American emigrants to Canada
American emigration
American diaspora in North America
Canada–United States relations
Ethnic groups in Canada